Airport Flyer is a pair of bus routes that serve Bristol Airport. The routes are operated by First West of England.

History 
In 2012, the route began operating 24 hours per day.

The A2 service was withdrawn in January 2018, after having its frequency halfed from hourly to two-hourly in January.

In 2018, twelve double-decker Alexander Dennis Enviro400 MMC-bodied Scania N250UD buses were deployed on the route.

During the COVID-19 pandemic when passenger numbers to the airport had reduced, the A1 route was changed and the bus began serving local stops. This arrangement was discontinued in April 2022. From May 2022, Bristol Zone bus tickets were no longer accepted on the route.

The frequency of route A1 was increased to every 12 minutes in October 2022.

Routes

A1 Bristol Bus Station to Bristol Airport

The A1 runs from Bristol Bus Station to Bristol Airport, serving the city centre and Temple Meads Station. The route between Bristol Bus Station and Lime Kiln roundabout is limited stop but from Lime Kiln Roundabout to the airport, the bus serves all stops.

A3 Weston-super-Mare to Bristol Airport

The A3 runs from Weston-super-Mare to Bristol Airport on a direct, but limited stop route via Locking Road and the A370 through Worle, Congresbury and Cleeve.

References 

Bus routes in England
Bus transport in Bristol
Airport bus services